The European Solar Telescope (EST) is a pan-European project to build a next-generation 4-metre class solar telescope, to be located at the Roque de los Muchachos Observatory in the Canary Islands, Spain. It will use state-of-the-art instruments with high spatial and temporal resolution that can efficiently produce two-dimensional spectral information in order to study the Sun's magnetic coupling between its deep photosphere and upper chromosphere. This will require diagnostics of the thermal, dynamic and magnetic properties of the plasma over many scale heights, by using multiple wavelength imaging, spectroscopy and spectropolarimetry.

The EST design will strongly emphasise the use of a large number of visible and near-infrared instruments simultaneously, thereby improving photon efficiency and diagnostic capabilities relative to other existing or proposed ground-based or space-borne solar telescopes. In May 2011 EST was at the end of its conceptual design study.

The EST is being developed by the European Association for Solar Telescopes (EAST), which was set up to ensure the continuation of solar physics within the European community. Its main goal is to develop, construct and operate the EST. The European Solar Telescope is often regarded as the counterpart of the American Daniel K. Inouye Solar Telescope which finished construction in November 2021.

Conceptual design study 

The conceptual design study conducted by research institutions and industrial companies was finalized in May 2011. The study took 3 years, cost €7 million and was co-financed by the European Commission under the EU's Seventh Framework Programme for Research (FP7). The study estimates a €150 million to design and construct the EST and projects about €6.5 million annually for its operation.

Partners 

The European Association for Solar Telescopes (EAST) is a consortium of 7 research institutions and 29 industrial partners from 15 European countries, that exists with the aim, among others, of undertaking the development of EST, to keep Europe in the frontier of Solar Physics in the world. As well as EAST intends to develop, construct and operate a next-generation large aperture European Solar Telescope (EST) in the Roque de los Muchachos Observatory, Canaries, Spain.

See also 
Daniel K. Inouye Solar Telescope
 List of solar telescopes

References

Notes

External links 
 Official EST homepage
 European Association for Solar Telescopes website
 European Solar Telescope in the Canary Island 

Solar telescopes
Proposed telescopes
European Union
Astrophysics
Plasma physics facilities
Astronomical observatories in the Canary Islands